Thomas Scanlon (16 August 1899 – 29 August 1951) was an Australian rules footballer who played with Collingwood in the Victorian Football League (VFL).

External links 

Thomas Scanlon's profile at Collingwood Forever

Notes 

1899 births
1951 deaths
Australian rules footballers from Victoria (Australia)
Collingwood Football Club players